Connex South Eastern was a train operating company in the United Kingdom owned by Connex that operated the South Eastern franchise from October 1996 until November 2003.

History
On 13 October 1996 Connex commenced operating the South Eastern franchise having beaten bids from a Management/FirstBus consortium, GB Railways and Stagecoach.

In December 2002, after the franchise ran into financial trouble, the Strategic Rail Authority agreed to bail it out with a £58 million injection, with the end date brought forward from 2011 until 2006. However continuing poor financial management resulted in the Strategic Rail Authority deciding to strip Connex of the franchise in June 2003. Connex South Eastern continued to operate the franchise until 8 November 2003 with the services transferring to the Strategic Rail Authority's South Eastern Trains subsidiary the following day.

Services
Connex South Eastern ran passenger services from London Blackfriars, London Bridge, London Cannon Street, London Charing Cross and London Victoria to Hayes,
Bromley North, Ramsgate, Dover Priory, Folkestone Harbour and Ore and various destinations within including Orpington, Sevenoaks, Dartford, Tunbridge Wells, Ashford and Canterbury West.

It also ran services between Sittingbourne and Sheerness; Paddock Wood, Maidstone West and Strood; and Maidstone West, Redhill and Three Bridges.

Rolling stock
Connex South Eastern inherited a large fleet of slam-door and power-door electric multiple units from Network SouthEast. The slam-door EMUs were Class 411s, Class 421s and Class 423s, built between 1956 and 1974, while the power-door EMUs were Class 365s, Class 465s and Class 466s, built between 1991 and 1995 as part of NSE's Networker family.

In 1998 Connex South Eastern leased twelve Class 508s from Angel Trains that were surplus to Merseyrail Electrics, to replace some of the elderly Class 411s.

Connex South Eastern ordered 10 three-carriage and 102 four-carriage Class 375s, and 36 five-carriage Class 376s in a couple of batches with the first entering service in April 2001.

Between 4 February and 20 March 2002, owing to a shortage of rolling stock, a preserved Class 201 Hastings unit was on loan to Connex South Eastern to operate two return journeys on Monday to Fridays between Charing Cross and Hastings.

Depots
Connex South Eastern's fleet was maintained at Ashford, Ramsgate, Slade Green and Gillingham depots.

References

External links

Connex website - Web archive

Defunct train operating companies
Railway companies established in 1996
Railway companies disestablished in 2003
Rail transport in Kent
Veolia
1996 establishments in England
2003 disestablishments in England
British companies established in 1996
British companies disestablished in 2003